Jeon So-min (Hangul: 전소민; born August 22, 1996) known professionally as Somin (Hangul: 소민), is a South Korean singer, songwriter, and composer known for her work as a member of the co-ed group Kard. She previously debuted as a member of April in 2015 and Puretty in 2012 under DSP.

Personal life 
Jeon So-min was born August 22, 1996 in Seongdong District, Seoul, South Korea, She studied at Seokyeong University and Seoul Broadcasting High School.

Somin has two older sisters. Twice's singer Jeongyeon is also a distant relative of Somin where she is the niece of the wife of Somin's uncle.

Somin opened her own YouTube Channel "Minny J" on April 9, 2019 to show people herself "not as Kard's Jeon So-min, but a lot of as the person Jeon So-min."

Career

2012–2014: Puretty and KARA Project 

On September 5, 2012, Somin debuted in the girl group Puretty, which is a South Korean group based in Japan, they were planning to debut in South Korea as well. They had their first performance at the 2012 Tokyo Toy Show and sang the song "Check it Love" which is the theme song for the anime Pretty Rhythm: Dear My Future.

The group disbanded in January 2014. without making their Korean debut.

In the same year, Somin, along with her fellow members Yoon Chae-kyung and Cho Shi-yoon, participated in KARA Project, a show which is aimed to find new members for the girl group KARA. Somin finished the show in third place, ultimately being eliminated.

2015–present: debut with April and Kard 
On August 24, 2015, she debuted again, as a member of the girl group April. But she left the group in November that year to focus on her studying.

In 2016, she became a member of the co-ed group Kard. They released three pre-debut singles before debuting on July 19, 2017 with the mini album Hola Hola.

In 2018, Somin was featured in a special version of Super Junior's "Lo Siento" with her fellow member Jiwoo. She also collaborate with Pentagon's Hui in the song "Swim Good," and they also performed together in Mnet's Breakers music show. in 2019, Somin starred along with CLC's Seungyeon, celebrity style Han Hye-yeon, other models and social media influencers in the beauty-themed show Next Beauty Creator, which airs on cable channel OnStyle, the seven cast members will upload a new video every Tuesday to their YouTube channel, as they battle it out to earn the most views and subscribers and win the title "next beauty creator." The winner will get the backing of the cable network for their work as a beauty influencer for the period of one year, including collaboration opportunities and media appearances.

Discography

As a featured artist

Filmography

Television

References

External links 

 Jeon So-min on Instagram

K-pop singers
Living people
South Korean women singers
South Korean female idols
People from Seoul
Singers from Seoul
South Korean women singer-songwriters
South Korean singer-songwriters
South Korean female dancers
South Korean women musicians
Seokyeong University alumni
1996 births